The Father of the Girl (French: Le père de Mademoiselle) is a 1953 French comedy film directed by Marcel L'Herbier and starring Arletty, Suzy Carrier and André Luguet.

Cast
 Arletty as Edith Mars  
 Suzy Carrier as Françoise Marinier  
 André Luguet as Monsieur Marinier  
 Denise Grey as Isabelle Marinier  
 Jacques François as Michel Leclair  
 Mauricet as Le ministre 
 Germaine Reuver as Agathe  
 Sophie Mallet as Adèle  
 Rosine Luguet as La jeune fille  
 Pierre Moncorbier as L'huissier 
 Claude Le Lorrain 
 Floriane Prévot

References

Bibliography 
 Parish, Robert. Film Actors Guide. Scarecrow Press, 1977.

External links 
 

1953 comedy films
French comedy films
1953 films
1950s French-language films
Films directed by Marcel L'Herbier
French black-and-white films
1950s French films